Irene L. Beland (June 21, 1906August 15, 2000) was an American nursing educator and patient-centered care researcher.

Biography 
Beland was born on June 21, 1906, in Loda, Illinois. In 1913, her family moved to Osage, Iowa. After high school, she taught at a country school for two years, before enrolling in St. Mary's Hospital School of Nursing in Rochester, Minnesota. She earned her nursing diploma three years later. Beland was later accepted into the department of physics and biochemistry at the University of Minnesota, earning a bachelor's degree in 1937 and a master's degree in 1938. Her master's thesis was titled The comparative toxicities of the cardiac glucosides in the frog.

Beland taught medical nursing at the University of Minnesota from 1938 to 1940 and held teaching positions at St. Mary's Hospital School of Nursing and Minneapolis General Hospital from 1940 to 1947. From 1947 until her retirement in 1970, she held a faculty position at Wayne State University in Detroit, Michigan.

Beland is credited with developing one of the country's first graduate programs for medical-surgical nursing specialists. In 1965, Macmillan published the first edition of her book, Clinical Nursing: Pathophysiological and Psychosocial Approaches. The book was one of the first to examine nursing from a holistic perspective. Beland would go on to author or co-author three more editions of the text. In 1983, she was named an honorary fellow of the American Academy of Nursing.

Beland died on August 15, 2000, in Rochester, Minnesota.  Her collection of papers is held at Boston University's Howard Gotlieb Archival Research Center.

Selected works

Books

Articles

References 

1906 births
2000 deaths
Nursing educators
American nurses
American women academics
Academics from Illinois
University of Minnesota College of Science and Engineering alumni
American women nurses
Wayne State University faculty
20th-century American women